"No Way to Say" is the thirty-first single released by Ayumi Hamasaki and her eighteenth number-one single. It came out November 6, 2003. The video won the award for "Best Pop Video" at the 2004 MTV Video Music Awards Japan, and the single won the Japan Record Award at the 2003 Japan Record Awards. The song is featured on the mini-album Memorial Address.

Track listing
 "No Way to Say" – 4:46
 "No Way to Say" (acoustic version)
 "Seasons" (acoustic version)
 "Dearest" (acoustic orchestra version)
 "Voyage" (acoustic orchestra version)
 "No Way to Say" (Vandalize/Realize mix)
 "No Way to Say" (instrumental) – 4:46

Live performances
October 3, 2003 – Music Station
November 1, 2003 – Ayu Ready?
November 6, 2003 – AX Music
November 7, 2003 – Music Station
November 15, 2003 – CDTV
November 15, 2003 – PopJam
November 19, 2003 – Sokuhou Uta no Daijiten
November 28, 2003 – Best Hit Song Festival
November 29, 2003 – Ayu Ready?
December 1, 2003 – Hey! Hey! Hey!
December 3, 2003 – FNS Music Festival
December 17, 2003 – Best Artist
December 20, 2003 – Ayu Ready?
December 22, 2003 – Hey! Hey! Hey! Christmas Special – "No Way to Say: Acoustic Version"
December 23, 2003 – Happy X-mas SHOW!
December 26, 2003 – Music Station Super Live
December 31, 2003 – Kouhaku Uta Gassen
December 31, 2003 – Japan Record Awards (2 performances)
December 31, 2003 – CDTV Special 2003-2004
March 14, 2004 – Japan Gold Disc Awards
December 23, 2007 – HAPPY X-mas SHOW!

Charts
Oricon sales chart (Japan)

  Total Sales :  425,000 (Japan)
  Total Sales :  460,000 (Avex)
 RIAJ certification: Platinum

External links
 "No Way to Say" information at Avex Network.
 "No Way to Say" information at Oricon.

Ayumi Hamasaki songs
2003 singles
Oricon Weekly number-one singles
Songs written by Ayumi Hamasaki
2003 songs
Song recordings produced by Max Matsuura
Avex Trax singles